"Get Started" is the debut album of the Swedish singer David Lindgren. Released in 2012 on EMI Sweden, the 10-track album contains collaborations with Lazee.

Track listing
"Rendezvous" (3:35)
"Hey!" (with Khoen) (3:41)
"Shout It Out" (3:05)
"Save Me Now" (3:30)
"Perfect Crime" (3:05)
"Get Started" (feat. Lazee & Nawuel) (3:08)
"Best Part" (3:40)
"On the Dancefloor" (3:23)
"Encore" (3:06)
"Shout It Out" (Acoustic Version) (3:13)

Charts

Weekly charts

Year-end charts

References

2012 debut albums